Kudus may refer to 

 Merhawi Kudus (born 1994), Eritrean cyclist
 Mohammed Kudus (born 2000), Ghanaian footballer
 Sunan Kudus (died 1550), founder of:
 Kudus, Indonesia, capital city of:
 Kudus Regency in Central Java, Indonesia
 Persiku Kudus, football team from Kudus, Kudus
 Koedoes Residency, a Residency in Central Java, Dutch East Indies from 1925 to 1931
 Menara Kudus Mosque in Kudus, Kudus
 Gereja Kristen Kalam Kudus, proselytic mission of the Evangelize China Fellowship in Indonesia

See also
 Kudos (disambiguation)
 Kudu (disambiguation)